Eoophyla mimicalis is a moth in the family Crambidae. It was described by George Hampson in 1917. It is found in Cameroon, the Republic of the Congo, the Democratic Republic of the Congo, Ghana, Kenya, Malawi, Nigeria, Sierra Leone, Tanzania and Uganda.

The wingspan is 13–16 mm. The forewings are whitish, suffused with dark fuscous. The base is fuscous towards the costa. The hindwings have a fuscous fascia near the base, as well as fuscous and ochreous scales forming an antemedian fascia. Adults are on wing year round.

References

Eoophyla
Moths described in 1917